I'm Your Woman is a 2020 American neo-noir crime film set in the 1970s and directed by Julia Hart from a screenplay by Hart and Jordan Horowitz. It stars Rachel Brosnahan, Arinzé Kene, Marsha Stephanie Blake, Bill Heck, Frankie Faison, Marceline Hugot and James McMenamin. Brosnahan plays Jean, a woman on the run after her husband, who is involved with organized crime, mysteriously goes missing.

The film's world premiere occurred at AFI Fest on October 15, 2020. It was given a limited release on December 4, 2020, followed by a December 11 release on Amazon Prime Video by Amazon Studios. The film received generally positive reviews, with praise for Brosnahan's performance and Hart's direction.

Plot
Jean is a housewife in the late 1970s, married to Eddie, a professional thief. The couple are unable to have or adopt children, something Jean has long since made her peace with. One day, Eddie mysteriously procures a baby boy for Jean to raise. Sometime later, Jean is awakened in the night by one of Eddie's business partners, Jimmy, who gives her a bag of money and instructs Jean to go on the run; she is handed over to a man named Cal, who Jimmy promises will help her. Jean learns from Cal that Eddie has gone missing and that everyone is looking for him. Cal relocates Jean and her baby, Harry, to a vacant house in the suburbs, with strict instructions not to make any friends or acquaintances.

Jean struggles with loneliness in her new surroundings and, defying Cal's instructions, befriends her widowed neighbor, Evelyn. After a late-night walk with Harry, Jean realizes that her home has been broken into and calls a number Cal gave her before escaping to Evelyn's house. There, she discovers some of Eddie's former associates, who believe Jean knows where to find him and beat Evelyn for her location before tying her up. Cal arrives and rescues Jean and Harry, killing everyone else including Evelyn; Jean is horrified, but Cal tells her Evelyn's death was her fault for not listening to him.

Cal relocates Jean and Harry to a remote cabin. He reveals to her that Eddie, an associate of a local crime syndicate, murdered his boss Marvin, plunging the city into gang warfare as different factions are fighting for Marvin's territory. Jean is eventually joined by Teri, Cal's wife, their son Paul, and Cal's elderly father, Art, who teaches her how to use a gun. Jean eventually pieces together that Teri was formerly married to Eddie, but ran away with her son because of his abusive and controlling nature. Realizing that Cal may be in trouble, Jean decides to join Teri in returning to the city to find him.

To get word to Cal that they are in the city, the two women go to a nightclub, where Jean gets lost during a shootout and becomes separated from Teri, eventually tracking her to a hotel. She learns that Paul is actually Eddie's son and that Teri and Cal, who met and fell in love while working under Eddie, had been living normal lives outside the syndicate until Eddie got in touch with Cal and forced him to help Jean.

Teri and Jean get separated again, and Jean tracks down Cal, who informs her that Eddie is dead. The trio attempt to leave the city, only to be intercepted by a rival gang boss, Mike; Teri crashes the car and Mike takes Jean at gunpoint. Not believing that Eddie is dead, he threatens Jean to tell her where her husband is, but Jean shoots him dead with a pistol previously given to her by Teri. She returns to the scene of the accident and rescues Teri and Cal. They return to the cabin to find Art dead, having killed two hitmen sent by Mike before dying of his wounds. Paul and Harry are found alive, and after reuniting with their children, the two families drive off together.

Cast
 Rachel Brosnahan as Jean
 Arinzé Kene as Cal
 Marsha Stephanie Blake as Teri
 Bill Heck as Eddie
 Frankie Faison as Art
 Marceline Hugot as Evelyn 
 James McMenamin as White Mike

Production
In April 2019, Rachel Brosnahan joined the cast of the film, with Julia Hart directing from a screenplay she wrote along with Jordan Horowitz. In September 2019, Arinzé Kene and Marsha Stephanie Blake joined the cast, and Bill Heck, Frankie Faison, Marceline Hugot, and James McMenamin joined in October.

Filming
Principal photography began in Pittsburgh in October 2019.

Release
The film premiered at the AFI Fest on October 15, 2020. It was given a limited release on December 4, 2020, followed by a December 11 release on Amazon Prime Video by Amazon Studios.

Reception
The website's critics consensus reads: "Smart, sophisticated, and subversive, I'm Your Woman is brought to life by a powerful performance from Rachel Brosnahan -- and finds director Julia Hart in near-total command of her craft." On Metacritic, the film has a weighted average score of 63 out of 100, based on 25 critics, indicating "generally favorable reviews".

References

External links
 
 Script 

2020 films
2020 crime drama films
American crime drama films
Amazon Studios films
Films directed by Julia Hart
Films shot in Pittsburgh
Films set in the 1970s
Films about parenting
2020s English-language films
2020s American films
English-language drama films